Ralph Heskett (born 3 March 1953, in Sunderland, England) is an English Roman Catholic prelate who has been the Bishop of Hallam since July 2014, having immediately before that been Bishop of Gibraltar from 2010 to 2014.

Early life and ministry 

He was educated at Saint Aidan's Grammar School, Sunderland, a Christian Brothers school, from 1964 to 1969. He was a seminarian from 1969 to 1970, where he attended the Redemptorist Minor Seminary in Birmingham. He subsequently was a novice at Perth, Scotland.

On 21 August 1971 he began his ecclesiastical studies at Hawkstone Hall and Canterbury. He was ordained as a priest on 10 July 1976 at St Benet's Church, Monkwearmouth, Sunderland. After his ordination he worked in Scotland until 1980 and then England until 1984. From 1987 to 1990 he was Redemptorist superior and pastor of Our Lady of the Annunciation at Bishop Eton, Liverpool.

From 1997 to 1999 he studied at All Hallows College. Heskett was parish priest at St Mary's Roman Catholic Church, Clapham from 1999 to 2008.

Episcopate 
He was appointed the Bishop of the Diocese of Gibraltar by Pope Benedict XVI on 18 March 2010. His consecration to the Episcopate took place on 10 July 2010; the principal consecrator was the Most Reverend Michael George Bowen, Archbishop Emeritus of Southwark, with the Right Reverend Charles Caruana, Bishop Emeritus of Gibraltar, and the Right Reverend Thomas Matthew Burns, Bishop of Menevia, serving as co-consecrators. 

Bishop Heskett was appointed Bishop of the Diocese of Hallam by Pope Francis on 20 May 2014, and installed in a Mass held on 10 July 2014.

References

External links
 
 

1953 births
Living people
People from Sunderland
21st-century Roman Catholic bishops of Gibraltar
21st-century Roman Catholic bishops in England
Alumni of All Hallows College, Dublin
Redemptorist bishops
Roman Catholic bishops of Hallam
English Roman Catholic bishops